Bulbophyllum evasum, commonly known as the creeping brittle orchid, is a species of epiphytic or lithophytic orchid with creeping brittle rhizomes, small, stubby pseudobulbs and dark green, fleshy leaves. The flowers are small, pink to reddish with dark stripes and yellow tips, clustered on the end of a dark red flowering stem. This orchid grows in rainforest on tree trunks and branches as well as on rocks, in tropical North Queensland.

Description
The flowers are bell-shaped, pink to reddish with dark red stripes and yellow tips and do not open widely. Flowering occurs from November to March.

Taxonomy and naming
Bulbophyllum evasum was first formally described in 1950 by Trevor Hunt & Herman Rupp and the description was published in the Proceedings of the Royal Society of Queensland from a specimen collected on a mountain near Mossman by Hugo Flecker. The specific epithet (evasum) is a Latin word meaning "evasion".

Distribution and habitat 

References

evasum
Orchids of Queensland
Plants described in 1949